John Cunningham Stadium was a baseball venue on the campus of the University of San Diego in San Diego, California, United States. It was home to the San Diego Toreros baseball team, a member of the Division I West Coast Conference. The park was built in 1970 and renovated in 2003. Renovations included the additions of synthetic turf in foul territory, a press box, and a public address system. The field had a capacity of 1,200 seats, all chair-backed.

The stadium was dedicated in 1988 for former San Diego baseball coach John Cunningham. Cunningham was the Torero head coach for 34 seasons.

Cunningham Stadium was demolished and replaced by a new venue after the 2012 season. The new ballpark, Fowler Park, was built on the same site.

References

Defunct college baseball venues in the United States
Demolished sports venues in California
San Diego Toreros baseball